Galižana  is a village in Istria, Croatia. It is part of the City District of Vodnjan, Istria County.

Population
According to the 2001 census, the settlement had 1,349 inhabitants  and 455 family households.

History
Galižana dates back to prehistoric times. There are several ancient stone round-houses known as Kažuni that date back to these times.  

During the Roman period, it was the center of the Pula colony where Roman roads intersected. 

As early as the 9th century, Galižana was under the administration of the bishops of Pula who owned land and the right to collect tithes.

In the 12th Century the name was known as Galisanum, as well as Golisana, and Calisanum. The Latin version of the settlement was Gallicianum. 

The Galician parish church (1613) was dedicated to St. Roko (1295 - 1327).

Stronger economic and cultural development began in the mid-19th Century with the construction of the Pula-Trieste railway, which passes through Galižana. 

It`s main economy is agriculture (olives) and tourism.

References

Populated places in Istria County